Aneta Wojtkowska (born 9 March 1991) is a Polish badminton player. She won her first National Championships title in 2013 partnered with her sister Agnieszka Wojtkowska. She competed at the 2015 European Games in Baku, Azerbaijan.

Achievements

BWF International Challenge/Series (4 titles, 6 runners-up) 
Women's doubles

Mixed doubles

  BWF International Challenge tournament
  BWF International Series tournament
  BWF Future Series tournament

References

External links 
 

1991 births
Living people
People from Głubczyce
Polish female badminton players
Badminton players at the 2015 European Games
European Games competitors for Poland